Trinity Catholic High School was a coeducational Roman Catholic high school in Harper Woods, Michigan, United States, and was part of the Roman Catholic Archdiocese of Detroit.

The school formed in the Fall of 2002 when St. Florian High School in Hamtramck, Michigan and Bishop Gallagher High School in Harper Woods, Michigan merged.

The school had 163 students enrolled at the time of its closing in 2005.

References

Educational institutions established in 2002
Educational institutions disestablished in 2005
Schools in Wayne County, Michigan
Defunct Catholic secondary schools in Michigan
Defunct schools in Michigan
2002 establishments in Michigan